Vermixocins A and B are isolates of Penicillium vermiculatum. Both compounds have cytotoxic activity in vitro.

References

Immunology
Lactones
Penicillium